Hugó Meltzl of Lomnitz (31 July 1846 – 20 January 1908) was a Hungarian scholar who was a knowledgeable professor at, and later rector of, the Franz Joseph University.

Life
Hugó Meltzl was born in Szászrégen, Hungary (now Reghin, Romania). His native language was German. He studied at the University of Kolozsvár and in Germany. He was appointed as professor of German (later French, Italian) history and language of the newly founded Franz Joseph University. From 1880 to 1889 he was the leader of the Faculty, then in 1894 he became the rector of the university. He was abroad at several times, including visiting Algeria. One of his major successes was that he made well known the works of Sándor Petőfi and József Eötvös in abroad.

He was an honorary member of the Freies Deutsches Hochstift of Frankfurt, the Antiquarian and Numismatic Society of Philadelphia, the American Philosophical Society (elected 1886), the Akademisch-Philosophischer Verein of Leipzig and the Scientific Aceademy and Petőfi Institute of Palermo.

Between 1877 and 1888, with Sámuel Brassai he was the co-editor and publisher of the multilingual Összehasonlító Irodalomtörténeti Lapokat (Acta Comparationis Litt. et Fontes Compar. Litt. Universarum). He signed as Hugó Lomnitzi.

He died on 20 January 1908 in Nagyvárad, Austria-Hungary (now Oradea, Romania), and was buried in Kolozsvár (Cluj-Napoca). He had a wife, called Hermine Berger.

References

Sources
 
 
 Kozma Dezső: Meltzl Hugó és a magyar irodalom (in Hungarian),  Korunk 3. folyam, 20. évf. 10. sz. (2009. október)  Online access
 PIM

Further information
 Bányai Elemér: Meltzl Hugó (in Hungarian), Nyugat,  1908. 3. szám  Online access
 T. Szabó Levente: Negotiating world literature in the first international journal of comparative literary studies. The Albanian case, Studia Universitatis Babes-Bolyai. Philologica 2012/2, 33–52.
 T. Szabó Levente: À la recherche... de l’editeur perdu. Brassai Sámuel and the first international journal of comparative literary studies = Storia, Identita e Canoni letterari, eds. Angela Tarantino, Ioana Bot, Ayșe Saraçgil, Florence University Press, 2013, 177–188. (Biblioteca di Studi di Filologia Moderna 19.)
 T. Szabó Levente: Negotiating the borders of Hungarian national literature: the beginnings of the Acta Comparationis Litterarum Universarum and the rise of Hungarian studies (Hungarologie), Transylvanian Review 2013/1. Supplement (Mapping Literature), 47–61.
 T. Szabó Levente: Az összehasonlító irodalomtudomány kelet-európai feltalálása és beágyazottsága. Az Acta Comparationis Litterarum Universarum – egy kutatás keretei = “...hogy legyen a víznek lefolyása...” Köszöntő kötet Szilágyi N. Sándor tiszteletére, ed. Benő Attila et al., 2013, 449–460.
 T. Szabó Levente: Mit tegyünk az első nemzetközi összehasonlító irodalomtudományi lappal? Szempontok az Összehasonlító Irodalomtörténelmi Lapok (Acta Comparationis Litterarum Universarum) újraértéséhez, Literatura 2014/2, 134–147.

1846 births
1908 deaths
People from Reghin
Academic staff of Franz Joseph University
Franz Joseph University alumni
Rectors of the Franz Joseph University
Members of the American Philosophical Society